"Eres tú" ("You Are") is a popular Spanish language song written in 1973 by Juan Carlos Calderón and performed by the Spanish band Mocedades, with Amaya Uranga performing the lead vocal.

It was chosen as 's entry in the Eurovision Song Contest 1973. After reaching  second place in the contest, it was released as a single.

This song also has an English version titled "Touch the Wind" with lyrics by Mike Hawker.

This song also has an Indonesian version titled "Hatiku" ("My Heart") with gospel lyrics used in Catholic mass.

Eurovision
The  edition of the Eurovision Song Contest took place on 7 April 1973 and was held at Luxembourg (city), the capital of Luxembourg. The song was performed seventh on the night, following 's Marie with "Un train qui part" and preceding 's Patrick Juvet with "Je vais me marier, Marie". Composer Juan Carlos Calderón himself conducted the live orchestra. At the close of voting, the song had received 125 points, placing second in a field of 17, after 's own Anne-Marie David with "Tu te reconnaîtras" with 129 points. The 's Cliff Richard with "Power to All Our Friends" finished third with 123 points. "Eres tú" was succeeded as Spanish representative at the 1974 contest by Peret with "Canta y sé feliz".

Worldwide success
In 1974, "Eres tú" became one of the few Spanish language songs to reach the top 10 in the United States, peaking at #9 in the Billboard Hot 100 chart and also reaching the top 10 on the Adult Contemporary chart. In the United States, it is still heard on Adult Standards and Easy Listening radio. The B-side of the single was the English-language version entitled "Touch the Wind", which featured a completely different set of lyrics, rather than a translation of the original Spanish lyrics. Radio stations generally preferred to play the original A-side version. There were also several covers of the tune in both English and Spanish, only one of which ("Touch the Wind" by Eydie Gorme), charted, becoming a minor Adult Contemporary hit.

With "Eres tú", Mocedades are one of the five musical acts from Spain to have scored a top ten hit in the United States (the others are Los Bravos, Julio Iglesias, Enrique Iglesias and Los del Río with "Macarena"), and the only to have a top ten hit sung entirely in Spanish (the version of Los del Río's "Macarena" was a remix by the Bayside Boys with English vocals). The song was inducted into the Latin Grammy Hall of Fame in 2013. In 2015, "Eres tú" ranked #47 on Billboard'''s 50 Greatest Latin Songs of All Time.

The success of "Eres tú" was not limited to just pop or Spanish music radio. In 1976, a guitar instrumental by country singer Sonny James reached #67 on the Hot Country Singles chart. In 1977, Tex-Mex country singer Johnny Rodriguez – who had earlier success with mixing English and Spanish lyrics in his songs – recorded a cover version and released it to country radio. The song peaked at #25 in the fall of 1977 on the Hot Country Singles chart.

Plagiarism controversy
One of the biggest Eurovision scandals resulted from the perceived similarity between the melody of "Eres tú" and that of 's 1966 entry "Brez besed" ("Without words"). However, the authors of "Brez besed" neither officially complained nor filed a lawsuit, as neither was common practise at the time.

Chart history

Weekly charts

Year-end charts

 In other languages 
By Mocedades
"Eres tú" (Spanish)
"Touch the Wind" (English)
"Das bist du" (German)
"C'est pour toi" (French)
"Viva noi" (Italian)
"Zu zara" (Basque)

By other groups

"Dicht bij jou" (Dutch)
"Rør Ved Mig" (Danish)
"Touch the Wind" (English)
"I mitt liv" (Norwegian)
"Rör vid mig" (Swedish)
"Správný tón" (Czech) 
"Eres tú" (Morat; Spanish, Colombia)
"Runoni kaunein olla voit" (Finnish) 
"Sinä vain" (Finnish)
"Co gai rung mo" (Vietnamese)
"That's You" (English)
"Will My Love Be You" (English) 
"C'est pour toi" (French) 
"Jy's vir my" (Afrikaans)
"É você" (Brazilian Portuguese)
"Du bist wie die Sonne" (German)
"Waar naartoe" (Dutch)
"Selline sa oled" (Estonian)
"" (Korean)

 Covers 

 Il Divo, "Eres tú" (2015).

101 Strings — "Eres tú" 
Acker Bilk — "Eres tú" 
Al estilo de Mocedades — "Eres tú"
Alvaro Clemente — "Eres tú"
Amaya Uranga & Juan Carlos Calderón — "Eres tú" 
Anacani — "Eres tú"
Andrés Calamaro — "Eres tú" 
An & Jan (Rot) — "Dicht bij jou" (Dutch) 
Atalaje — "Eres tú" 
Austin Kelley & Mantovani — "Eres tú"
Bedevilers — "Eres tú" (punk rock)
Bert Kaempfert — "Touch the Wind" (English) 
Bertín Osborne — "Eres tú" 
Bing Crosby — "Eres tú" (included in his 1975 album Bingo Viejo)
Bo Doerek — "Eres tú" 
Bres Bezed — "Eres tú"
Bullerfnis — "Rør ved mig" (Danish) 
Byron Lee and the Dragonaries — "Eres tú"
Calito Soul — "Eres tú"
Camila Mendes — "Eres tú" (Riverdale)
Cerveza Mahou — "Eres tú"
Charo — "Eres tú" 
Collage — "Selline sa oled" (Estonian) 
Daniela Castillo — "Eres tú" 
Dansk top — "Rør Ved Mig" (Danish) 
David and the High Spirits — "Eres tú"
Eydie Gormé — "Eres tú"
Eydie Gormé — "Touch the Wind" (1973 B-side)
El Chaval De La Peca — "Eres tú" 
El Consorcio — "Eres tú" 
El Frenillo de Gaugin — "Eres tú" (punk rock)
El ser y ser — "Eres tú" (rap) 
Ennio Emmanuel- "Eres tú" (Spanish)
Estela Raval — "Eres tú" (Argentine Spanish)
Ex Masters — "San joe taigie mie" (Surinamese) 
Floyd Cramer — "Touch the Wind" (English) 
Gé Korsten — "Touch the Wind" (English) 
Gebroeder Brouwer — "Eres tú" (Trumpet instrumental) 
GrupoSarao — "Eres tú"
Hella Joof & Peter Frödin — "Rør ved mig" (Danish) 
Howard Morrison Chor — "Eres tú" 
III of a Kind Philippines — "Eres tú"
Ilanit — "Eres tú" 
Inger Lise Rypdal — "I mitt liv" (Norwegian)
Inger Öst — "Rör vid mig" (Swedish)
Jimmy Mitchell — "Eres tú" (Spanish with Texan accent) 
Johnny Mathis and Juan Carlos Calderón — "Touch the Wind" (English with Spanish chorus)
Johnny Reimar — "Rør ved mig" (Danish) 
Johnny Rodriguez — "Eres tú"
Josh Santana — "Eres tú" (Philippines 2009) 
Juan Carlos Calderón — "Eres tú" (composer version) 
Justo Lamas — "Eres tú"
Karel Gott, Spravny Ton — "Eres tú" (Czech)
Kathy Kelly — "Eres tú"
Katri Helena — "Runoni kaunein olla voit" (Finnish)
Katri Helena — "Sinä vain" (Finnish) 
The Kelly Family — "Eres tú" on Honest Workers (1991) 
Khanh Hà — "Cô gái rừng mơ"  (Vietnamese) 
Korean Choir — "Eres tú"
La Academia 4ta Generación — "Eres tú"
La Decada Prodigiosa — "Eres tú" 
Lady Lu — "Eres tú"
Landscape — "Touch the Wind" (English)
Lecia & Lucienne — "Rør ved mig" (Danish) 
Lettermen — "Eres tú"
Liceo Panamericano — "Eres tú"
Little Angels of Korea — "Eres tú"
Lola Ponce — "Eres tú" 
Luis Chacon — "Eres tú" 
Luis Miguel — "Eres tú" (produced by Calderón)
Lupita D'Alessio — "Eres tú" 
Luz Casal — "Eres tú"
Mantovani Orchestra — "Eres tú"
Mariachi Vargas — "Eres tú" 
Mona — I mitt liv (Norwegian) 
Nana Mouskouri — "Touch the Wind" (English)
Pandora — "Eres tú"
Patricia Y Los Stars — "Eres tú"
Patti Donelli @ USC-Pgh — "Touch the Wind" (English)
Percy Faith — "Touch the Wind" (English) 
Perry Como — "Eres tu" (April 29, 1974)
Perry Como — "That's You" (English) 
Perpetuum Jazzile — "Brez besed"/"Eres tú" (ironic medley of Eres tu with the song Calderón was accused of copying)
Petula Clark — "Will My Love Be You" (English)
Pistas — "Eres tú" (Panflute)
Ray Conniff — "Eres tú"
Reggae Chico Man — "Eres tú"
Rika Zarai — "C'est pour toi" (French) 
Rina Hugo — "Jy's vir my" (Afrikaans) 
Roberto Delgado — "Eres tú" (Instrumental)
Rob's Band — "Eres tú"
Romantica de Xalapa — "Eres tú" 
Sandy Caldera — "Eres tú" 
Self Help Marines — "Eres Tu" — steel band instrumental version*
Sonny James — "Eres tú"
 Soul Sanet — "Eres tú"
 Stef Meeder — "Tweedle dee", "Eres tú" (instrumental medley)
 Supremas de Mostoles — "Eres tú"
 Sweethearts — "Rør ved mig" (Danish)
 TBC — "Rør ved mig" (Danish Rap)
 Thalía — "Tómame o déjame"
 The Mockers — "Eres tú"
 Tish Hinojosa — "Eres tú"
 Trigo Limpio Nueva Era — "Eres tú" (live)
 Volkana — Eurovision medley including "Eres tú"
 Wheeler St James — "Touch the Wind" (English)
 Willeke Alberti — "Waar naartoe" (Dutch) 
 Yamaha Music — The theme from the song's chorus, with new English lyrics, was used by Yamaha Music in Australia for its advertisements during the 1970s and 80s.
 Zereno — "Eres tú" 
 Aida Vedishcheva — "" (Russian)
 Verda Sümer & İstanbul Gelişim Orkestrası — "Eski dostlar ne oldu" (Turkish)
 A guitar instrumental version of "Eres tú" was used in a Bank of New Zealand TV advertising campaign in the 1990s.
 In the movie Tommy Boy, there's a scene in which Chris Farley and David Spade sing the original Spanish version of "Eres tú" while presumably returning to Ohio.
 The cast of Dutch series '' (a Spanish hotel run by 1970s ex-patriots) performed the song as "Er is toe" ("Dessert is ready").
 In the web series, Jake and Amir (web series) Amir sings this song to Jake after getting back from a trip to Mexico.

References

Sources and external links
 Official Eurovision Song Contest site, history by year, 1973.
 Detailed info and lyrics, The Diggiloo Thrush, "Eres tú".
 Official Mocedades site, Spanish version lyrics
 Official Mocedades site, English version lyrics
 Official Mocedades site "Touch the Wind" lyrics
 
 

Spanish-language songs
1973 singles
1974 singles
Eurovision songs of 1973
Congratulations Eurovision songs
Eurovision songs of Spain
Songs written by Juan Carlos Calderón
Latin Grammy Hall of Fame Award recipients
Philips Records singles
Sony Music singles
Syco Music singles
Columbia Records singles
Mercury Records singles
1973 songs